Mozart the music processor is a proprietary WYSIWYG scorewriter program for Microsoft Windows. It is used to create and edit Western musical notation to create and print sheet music, and to play it via MIDI.

The program was named after the composer Wolfgang Amadeus Mozart.

History

Origins
Work was started on the software in the late 1980s as a personal project to assist its author in arranging music for the groups in which he played. The model was that of a WYSIWYG word processor, but for music notation. The idea was to be able to type the music as a document, save it in a file, print it as well as play it back through the computer's speakers. Following the advent of the internet, Version 1 was released to the world on 9 November 1994.

Development

Mozart 1, in 1994, was entirely based on its author's vision of what a music processor should be. Mozart's development in the subsequent decades has been driven by the needs of its users. Elaine Gould's 2011 book, Behind Bars, is the primary guide to developing and maintaining music engraving in Mozart, as it is for other score writers.

Timeline
Since the initial release in 1994, new major versions have been released regularly. Intermediate free service packs are issued as needed.
1994: Mozart 1 – a 16 bit program for Windows 3.1
1996: Mozart 2 – a 32 bit program for Windows 95
1997–2001: Mozart 3 – Mozart 6
2002: Mozart Viewer/Reader is released: a free program which will view, print, and play Mozart (.mz) files
2003: Mozart 7
2004: Mozart 8 – aka Mozart 2005
2006–09: Mozart 9, 10
2010: The Mozart Jazz Font is introduced
2011–14: Mozart 11, 12
2016: Mozart 13 – introduces the ribbon bar interface
2018: Mozart 14 – automates proportional spacing
2020: Mozart 15 – symbols, rendering, interface improvements
2022: Mozart 16 – playback, arpeggiation

Features

Interface
Score entry by computer keyboard, mouse, on-screen piano keyboard, external MIDI instrument
Extensive set of keyboard shortcuts with additional customisable mapping
Programmable through macros
Import: MusicXML, NIFF, abc, MIDI (.MID, .RMI, .KAR)
Export: MusicXML, abc, MIDI (.MID, .RMI, .KAR), images including BMP, GIF, PNG, JPEG, TIFF, EMF
Help: extensive, context-sensitive help system

Score and instrumentation
An extensible library of score templates
Support for a large collection of transposing instruments
Support for tablature notation, chord symbols, chord shapes, and percussion.
Support for a number of plucked string instruments (i.a. guitar, banjo, ukulele, lute, tamburitza) in various tunings
Score can be shown in concert pitch, written pitch, B pitch
Transposition to any key
Extraction of parts from a score

Music entry
Clefs include treble, bass, alto, tenor, percussion, tablature, and others.
Time signatures automatically respected in the music
Key signatures from 7 flats to 7 sharps and changes with optional cancelling naturals
Repeated accidentals automatically respected
Optional courtesy accidentals
Cross- and diamond-shaped note heads, cue notes
Enharmonic transformations involving

Lyrics attached to notes
All text items support Unicode characters
Text entry has keyboard shortcuts for accented characters and symbols

Play-back
Playback optionally with tracking cursor
Playback follows repeats and redirections
Playback obeys dynamics, pedal marks, phrasing, rubato, and articulation including tremolo and reiteration

Miscellaneous
Mozart 10 Gold-certified to run under Wine-1.1.36 on Slackware Linux 12.1
Support for foot pedal page turners

Limitations
No macOS support
Limited control over MIDI events
Time signature must be common to all parallel staves
No Gregorian chant notation
No quarter tone or other microtonal notations
No handbell support
Minimal support for extended techniques and contemporary notations

See also
Music engraving
Scorewriter
Comparison of scorewriters
List of music software

References

Further reading
 also in German as

External links

Free reader/viewer/player/printer; evaluation version

Scorewriters
Windows multimedia software
Music publishing